Kazimierz Piotr Staszewski (born 12 March 1963), also known as Kazik, is a Polish singer and songwriter. He is the son of the architect and poet Stanisław Staszewski. He is the frontman of the band Kult, which he founded in 1982; their latest album, Ostatnia Płyta, was released in 2021. In 1991, he launched a solo career with one of the first Polish rap albums, Spalam się.

Discography

Studio albums

Cover albums

References

External links 

 www.kazik.pl (in Polish)
 www.kult.art.pl (in Polish)

1963 births
Living people
Musicians from Warsaw
20th-century Polish male singers
21st-century Polish male singers
21st-century Polish singers
Polish atheists
MTV Europe Music Award winners